Andrew Jackson Rogers (July 1, 1828 – May 22, 1900) was an American lawyer, teacher, clerk, police commissioner and Democratic Party politician who represented  in the United States House of Representatives for two terms from 1863 to 1867.

Early life and career
Born in Hamburg, New Jersey, Rogers attended common schools as a child. He was employed as a clerk in a hotel and a country store, engaged in teaching for two years, studied law and was admitted to the bar in 1852, commencing practice in Lafayette Township, New Jersey. He moved to Newton, New Jersey, in 1857 and continued to practice law.

Congress
In 1862, Rogers elected as a Democratic Party member of the United States House of Representatives, serving in office from March 4, 1863, to March 3, 1867.

Lincoln assassination investigation
He was also part of the House Committee that looked into the assassination of President Abraham Lincoln. Only the chairman, George Boutwell, the chairman of the House of Representatives Committee, was allowed to look into the relevant papers. Afterwards, Rogers accused him of being involved in an attempt to cover-up Edwin M. Stanton's role in the assassination.

As a Congressman, Rogers served on the Joint Committee on Reconstruction which drafted the Fourteenth Amendment to the United States Constitution.

Later career and death
After being unsuccessful for reelection, Rogers moved to New York City in 1867 and became counsel for the city in important litigation. He moved to Denver, Colorado, in 1892 and served as police commissioner of Denver. He returned to New York City in 1896 and died there on May 22, 1900. He was interred in Woodlawn Cemetery in New York City.

References

External links
.  Includes Guide to Research Collections where his papers are located.
Andrew Jackson Rogers at The Political Graveyard

1828 births
1900 deaths
New Jersey lawyers
American police chiefs
People from Hamburg, New Jersey
People from Lafayette Township, New Jersey
People from Newton, New Jersey
Politicians from New York City
Democratic Party members of the United States House of Representatives from New Jersey
Politicians from Denver
Burials at Woodlawn Cemetery (Bronx, New York)
People of New Jersey in the American Civil War
19th-century American politicians
Lawyers from New York City
19th-century American lawyers